In mathematics, the name symplectic group can refer to two different, but closely related, collections of mathematical groups, denoted  and  for positive integer n and field F (usually C or R). The notation used here is consistent with the size of the most common matrices which represent the groups. Note that when we refer to the (compact) symplectic group it is implied that we are talking about the collection of (compact) symplectic groups, indexed by their dimension .

The name "symplectic group" is due to Hermann Weyl as a replacement for the previous confusing names (line) complex group and Abelian linear group, and is the Greek analog of "complex".

The metaplectic group is a double cover of the symplectic group over R; it has analogues over other local fields, finite fields, and adele rings.

The symplectic group is a classical group defined as the set of linear transformations of a -dimensional vector space over the field  which preserve a non-degenerate skew-symmetric bilinear form. Such a vector space is called a symplectic vector space, and the symplectic group of an abstract symplectic vector space  is denoted . If the bilinear form is represented by the nonsingular skew-symmetric matrix Ω, then

where MT is the transpose of M.  Often Ω is defined to be

where In is the identity matrix.  In this case,  can be expressed as those block matrices , where , satisfying the three equations:

Since all symplectic matrices have determinant , the symplectic group is a subgroup of the special linear group . When , the symplectic condition on a matrix is satisfied if and only if the determinant is one, so that .

Typically, the field  is the field of real numbers  or complex numbers . In these cases  is a real/complex Lie group of real/complex dimension . These groups are connected but non-compact.

equipped with the commutator as its Lie bracket.  For the standard skew-symmetric bilinear form , this Lie algebra is the set of all block matrices  subject to the conditions

The symplectic group over the field of complex numbers is a non-compact, simply connected, simple Lie group.

is the complexification of the real group .  is a real, non-compact, connected, simple Lie group. It has a fundamental group isomorphic to the group of integers under addition. As the real form of a simple Lie group its Lie algebra is a splittable Lie algebra.

Some further properties of :

 The exponential map from the Lie algebra  to the group  is not surjective. However, any element of the group can be represented as the product of two exponentials. In other words,

 For all  in :

The matrix  is positive-definite and diagonal. The set of such s forms a non-compact subgroup of  whereas  forms a compact subgroup. This decomposition is known as 'Euler' or 'Bloch–Messiah' decomposition. Further symplectic matrix properties can be found on that Wikipedia page.

 As a Lie group,  has a manifold structure.

Infinitesimal generators
The members of the symplectic Lie algebra   are the Hamiltonian matrices.

See classical group for a derivation.

Example of symplectic matrices
For , the group of  matrices with determinant , the three symplectic -matrices are:

Sp(2n, R) 
It turns out that  can have a fairly explicit description using generators. If we let  denote the symmetric  matrices, then  is generated by  whereare subgroups of pg 173pg 2.

Relationship with symplectic geometry
Symplectic geometry is the study of symplectic manifolds. The tangent space at any point on a symplectic manifold is a symplectic vector space.

A symplectic vector space is itself a symplectic manifold. A transformation under an action of the symplectic group is thus, in a sense, a linearised version of a symplectomorphism which is a more general structure preserving transformation on a symplectic manifold.

That is,  is just the quaternionic unitary group, . Indeed, it is sometimes called the hyperunitary group.

Note that  is not a symplectic group in the sense of the previous section—it does not preserve a non-degenerate skew-symmetric -bilinear form on : there is no such form except the zero form.

 is a real Lie group with (real) dimension . It is compact and simply connected.

The Lie bracket is given by the commutator.

Important subgroups
Some main subgroups are:

 
 
 

Conversely it is itself a subgroup of some other groups:

 
 
 

Relationship between the symplectic groups
Every complex, semisimple Lie algebra has a split real form and a compact real form; the former is called a complexification of the latter two.

These correspond to the Lie groups  and  respectively.

Physical significance

Classical mechanics
The compact symplectic group  comes up in classical physics as the symmetries of canonical coordinates preserving the Poisson bracket.

Consider a system of  particles, evolving under Hamilton's equations whose position in phase space at a given time is denoted by the vector of canonical coordinates,

The elements of the group  are, in a certain sense, canonical transformations on this vector, i.e. they preserve the form of Hamilton's equations. If

are new canonical coordinates, then, with a dot denoting time derivative,

where

for all  and all  in phase space.

For the special case of a Riemannian manifold, Hamilton's equations describe the geodesics on that manifold. The coordinates  live on the underlying manifold, and the momenta  live in the cotangent bundle. This is the reason why these are conventionally written with upper and lower indexes; it is to distinguish their locations. The corresponding Hamiltonian consists purely of the kinetic energy: it is  where  is the inverse of the metric tensor  on the Riemannian manifold. In fact, the cotangent bundle of any smooth manifold can be a given a symplectic structure in a canonical way, with the symplectic form defined as the exterior derivative of the tautological one-form.

Quantum mechanics

Consider a system of  particles whose quantum state encodes its position and momentum. These coordinates are continuous variables and hence the Hilbert space, in which the state lives, is infinite-dimensional. This often makes the analysis of this situation tricky. An alternative approach is to consider the evolution of the position and momentum operators under the Heisenberg equation in phase space.

Construct a vector of canonical coordinates,

The canonical commutation relation can be expressed simply as

where

Many physical situations only require quadratic Hamiltonians, i.e. Hamiltonians of the form

where  is a  real, symmetric matrix. This turns out to be a useful restriction and allows us to rewrite the Heisenberg equation as

The solution to this equation must preserve the canonical commutation relation. It can be shown that the time evolution of this system is equivalent to an action of the real symplectic group, on the phase space.

See also
 Orthogonal group
 Unitary group
 Projective unitary group
 Symplectic manifold, Symplectic matrix, Symplectic vector space, Symplectic representation 
 Representations of classical Lie groups
 Hamiltonian mechanics
 Metaplectic group
 Θ10

Notes

References
 

.

.

Lie groups
Symplectic geometry